Men's and women's gymnastics events were held at the 1959 Pan American Games in Chicago, United States.


Medal table

Medalists

Artistic gymnastics

Men's events

Women's events

Club swinging

Rope climbing

Trampoline and tumbling

See also
Pan American Gymnastics Championships
South American Gymnastics Championships
Gymnastics at the 1960 Summer Olympics

References 

1959
Events at the 1959 Pan American Games
Pan American Games
1959 Pan American Games
1959 Pan American Games